Banger For Breakfast is the fourth album released by Wicked Tinkers.

Musicians
Aaron Shaw - Great Highland Bagpipe
Warren Patrick Casey - Tapan, Bodhran
Keith Jones - Snare, Djembe
Jay Atwood - Didgeridoo, Irish Horn

Special Guest Artists
Donnie MacDonald, Men of Worth
Octave Mandolin & Vocals
James Keigher, Men of Worth, Bodhran

Credits
Produced by: Thistle Pricks

Recorded on location at various venues across America.

Mixed by: Scott Fraser at Architecture, Los Angeles, CA.
Captured on an Apple Powerbook G3 computer and a FireLite 30 GB hard drive with Digital Performer 3.01, and two “Mark of the Unicorn” (MOTU) 828s. All really great products.

A very special thanks to Scott Fraser for his ideas and support with the engineering for “On Location Recording.” He has been a great resource in the new world of digital recording.

Mastered by: Brian Gardner, Bernie Grundman Mastering, Hollywood, CA.

Graphic Design & Production: Warren Casey & Wendy Weisenberg - 
Photography : Dan Harrison, Digital Photography, Jamestown, CA. 
All photos of Wicked Tinkers shot at Calaveras Celtic Faire . Thanks Patrick, for having us. 
Banger Shot: Warren Casey - 
Copy Editors: Wendy Weisenberg & Aaron Shaw

Track listing
Hugh Ross
Jigs & Reels
Those Marching O'Neills
Cabar Feidh
Danny Boy
"Wicked Tinkers - Compulsive!"
Belly Dance & Hornpipes/Mazurka
Just Some Jigs
Harry's Hornpipes
Atholl Highlanders
Slip Jig Set
Seal Set
"Piper's Lung"
Hornpipe/Jig Set
Amazing Grace, Scotland The Brave, & Black Bear Hornpipe
"Red Hot Metal"
Hammered
Jam With Men of Worth
"Sorting Hat"
The Pumpkin's Fancy
Wallop The Cat

2003 live albums
Wicked Tinkers albums